Steven Sclaroff is an American interior designer. The New York Times has described his work as "[melding] disparate styles with a touch of humor" and named him among the "new guard" of interior design. Both New York magazine and Gotham have named Sclaroff in their lists of top 100 architects and designers in New York. The World of Interiors named the green bedroom he designed for Kate and Andy Spade as one of the "most outstanding" the magazine ever published in its history.

Early life and education

Sclaroff worked in an antiques shop at 12, and sold modern and Arts and Crafts furniture to dealers at flea markets at 16. He studied architecture at Carnegie Mellon University.

Design career

In 1994, Sclaroff joined Aero Studios, working on Giorgio Armani's New York apartment, the Soho Grand Hotel, 60 Thompson, and the Hard Rock Hotel and Casino.

He founded his eponymous design firm in 1999, and he opened a retail store in 2001, initially on Greenwich Street, relocated to White Street in 2007.

Sclaroff's residential projects prominently include Kate and Andy Spade's Upper East Side apartment and Southampton home, and residences for Edward Klein, Tony Kushner, and Jason Pomeranc; he also contributed to the home of Honey Dijon. Corporate clients include Donna Karan, Kate Spade New York and Jack Spade, Quiksilver, and Thompson Hotels' 6 Columbus property. He has designed products for Nanz Custom Hardware, Remains Lighting, and Waterworks.

As a writer, Sclaroff has contributed to Metropolitan Home, New York magazine, and The New York Times.

References

External links
 

American interior designers
Living people
Carnegie Mellon University alumni
Year of birth missing (living people)